Telephone numbers in Asia have the most possible prefixes of any continent on Earth: 2, 3, 6, 7, 8, 9. Below is a list of country calling codes for various states and territories in Asia.

States and territories with country calling codes

States and territories without a separate country calling code

See also
Telephone numbering plan
National conventions for writing telephone numbers
List of country calling codes
List of international call prefixes

Communications in Asia
International telecommunications
Telecommunications in Asia
Telephone numbers
Asia